Avia Solutions Group is a provider of aviation capacity solutions for passenger and cargo airlines worldwide. Headquartered in Dublin (Ireland), the group manages over 100 offices and production facilities globally and employs a majority of its employees in Europe.

In 2023, Avia Solutions Group manages a fleet of 165 aircraft among the group companies.

History

Prehistory 
In 2005, the history of Avia Solutions Group began when Lithuanian Airlines, the national airlines of Lithuania, was privatized. LAL investment management acquired 100% of the airline shares for 7.53 million Euro. The airline was re-branded and several companies were spun – out, including Baltic Ground Services (ground handling), FL Technics (aviation maintenance, repair, and operations), and Bilietų Pardavimo Centras (travel agency). In 2005, FL Technics was founded. The company opened its first hangar at Vilnius International Airport. In November 2006, Baltic Aviation Academy (now known as BAA Training) was founded. The company trains FTO (Flight Training Organization) and TRTO (Type Rating Training Organization) specialists. In 2007, JetMS was founded under the name FL Technics Jets. In 2007, Aviation Asset Management was founded (now known as AviaAM Leasing). In 2008, a charter airline called Small Planet Airlines was founded.

Foundation 

The history of Avia Solutions Group began in 2005, when Lithuanian Airlines, the national airlines of Lithuania, was privatized. LAL investicijų valdymas acquired 100% of the airline shares for 7.53 million Euro. The airline was re-branded as FlyLAL and several companies were spun – out, including Baltic Ground Services (ground handling), FL Technics (aviation maintenance, repair, and operations), and Bilietų Pardavimo Centras (travel agency). In 2008, FlyLAL filed a lawsuit against Latvian carrier airBaltic, accusing airline of price dumping. In 2009, FlyLAL was forced to declare bankruptcy with around 29 million euros in debts after the government refused to bail the company out and a potential buyout deal fell through. In 2014, Court of Justice of the European Union allowed to arrest the property of airBaltic and Riga International Airport in order to ensure main proceedings, seeking legal redress for damage resulting from alleged infringements of European Union competition law in the FlyLAL lawsuit against airBaltic for price dumping.

Expansion 

In the beginning, Avia Solutions Group covered three aviation business areas, including ground handling (Baltic Ground Services), aircraft maintenance (FL Technics) and travel services (Bilietu Pardavimo Centras).

In December 2005, Bilietų Pardavimo Centras became a member of IATA and in November 2006, changed its name into BPC Travel (stands for Best Price for Consumers Travel) to better reflect its business philosophy. BPC Travel left Avia Solutions Group in 2010.

In July 2006, Baltic Ground Services was sold to UAB Finansų spektro investicija. The company was bought back by Avia Solutions Group from investment company Invalda in November 2008. The same year Baltic Ground Services became first company in Europe and tenth in world to receive IATA Safety Audit for Ground Operations (ISAGO) certificate. In January 2015, Baltic Ground Services joined IATA's Ground Handling Council (IGHC).

In November 2006, Baltic Aviation Academy (originally flyLAL Training) was established based on the training center of FlyLAL. Company provides FTO (Flight Training Organization) and TRTO (Type Rating Training Organization) type rating for 10+ aircraft types and operates full flight simulators for Airbus A320 and other aircraft.

In 2007, the group established Aviation Asset Management (now AviaAM Leasing). In June 2008, it signed its first third-party lease contract with Kazakh Scat Air. AviaAM leasing left the group in 2010. In 2013, AviaAM Leasing launched its IPO and now is listed on WSE.

In 2008, Avia Solutions Group separated its charter flights activities from FlyLAL and established a charter airline. In July 2010, it underwent a major re-branding and became Small Planet Airlines. In March, 2013, Avia Solutions Group sold 99.5 per cent of Small Planet Airlines UAB (Lithuania) and Small Planet Airlines Sp. z.o.o. (Poland) to an investment group led by the carrier's management team.

In 2010, FL Technics achieved Boeing 737 NG base maintenance certificate. In October 2011, Boeing selected FL Technics as its GoldCare partner. In 2014, FL Technics invested $4 million in new high-tech MRO hangar in Kaunas. In 2014, company launched Online Training™, a remote EASA Part-147-compliant training program, based on visually enhanced materials available online.

In 2010, Avia Solutions Group established an IT company, which developed its own platform to trade aircraft inventory and maintenance services. In 2014, Locatory.com launched Amber A.I., artificial intelligence tool that converts e-mail parts inquiries into searches.

In 2011, Avia Solutions Group launched AviationCV.com, a global provider of aviation jobs specialists resourcing solutions for airlines, MRO providers and other industry companies.

In 2011, Avia Solutions Group was listed on the Warsaw Stock Exchange (WSE).

In 2011, Groups’ MRO company FL Technics acquired 100% of UK based Line maintenance provider Storm Aviation.

In 2013, Avia Solutions Group acquired Helisota, an international provider of MRO services for rotorcraft aviation that provides services for Mi and Robinson aircraft.

In 2013, Avia Solutions Group launched its own private jet charter carrier KlasJet. The carrier is based in Vilnius, Lithuania and operates its flights in Europe, CIS and other regions.

In 2014, BAA Training launched an aviation training IT software developer MOMook.

In 2015, Avia Solutions Group launched a Lithuanian tour operator Kidy Tour, as well as a UAV-based infrastructure inspections provider Laserpas. The company sold its interest to the management of Laserpas in August 2018.

In 2016, Avia Solutions Group launched a competence development center Emblick, acquired Estonian tour operator GoAdventure EE. The Group's subsidiary in Indonesia also opened a new MRO center in Jakarta.

In 2018, daughter company of Avia Solutions Group, BAA Training has announced the establishment of a new company in Vietnam—BAA Training Vietnam.

In August, 2018, FL Technics Indonesia received Part-145 certificate from the Federal Aviation Authority.

In October, 2018, FL Technics established a joint venture in Harbin (PR of China) with Aircraft Recycling International Limited to provide MRO services.

In October, 2018, BAA Training installed 2 new full flight simulators in Vilnius (Lithuania) and opened a training base in Lleida-Alguaire International Airport (Spain). BAA Training signed a Memorandum of Understanding with Henan Civil Aviation Development and Investment Company (HNCA) to establish Joint Venture aviation training company in Henan, China

In October 2018, Baltic Ground Services established a new railway freight company – BGS Rail in Ukraine.

On November 20, 2018, Avia Solutions Group was delisted from the Warsaw Stock Exchange.

In December 2018, Baltic Ground Services (BGS) announced the acquisition of a ground handling company in Germany.

In October 2019, Avia Solutions Group acquired British air charter specialist Chapman Freeborn.

On January 24, 2020, Avia Solutions Group signed an agreement with BB Holding EHF for the full acquisition of the Icelandic Air Freight services provider Bluebird Nordic.

In February, 2020 FL Technics acquired Italian line maintenance services provider Flash Line Maintenance S.r.l.

On February 14, 2020, Avia Solutions Group signed an agreement to acquire Scandinavian ground handling company – Aviator.

In April 2020, Avia Solutions Group joined The American Chamber of Commerce in Lithuania.

On June 18, 2020, Chapman Freeborn acquired Arcus Air Logistics.

In July 2020, a subsidiary of Avia Solutions Group Jet Maintenance Solutions established JetMS Regional.

In November 2020, tour operator Kidy Tour was renamed to Tiketa Tour. In December 2021, the company changed its name back to Kidy Tour.

In December 2020, a subsidiary of Avia Solutions Group FL Technics acquired Canadian MRO company Wright International.

In February 2021, Avia Solutions Group's subsidiary BAA Training Spain began its operations.

In March 2021, a subsidiary of Avia Solutions Group Jet Maintenance Solutions specializing in private and business aircraft maintenance, repair and overhaul acquired London based RAS Group (now JETMS Completions) consisting of Ras Completions Limited and RAS Interiors Limited.

In April 2021, a subsidiary of Avia Solutions Group FL Technics launched a full-scale service FL Technics Logistics Solutions.

In May 2021, BAA Training established an MRO organisation Avia Repair Co at Lleida-Alguaire International Airport in Spain.

In August 2021, FL Technics' subsidiary Storm Aviation acquired Manchester-based Chevron Technical Services.

In September 2021, Avia Solutions Group announced an entry into a strategic partnership with Certares Management LLC through a 300 million euro investment.

In October 2021, Avia Solutions Group acquired Biggin Hill Hangar Company Limited, the owner of Hangar 510, a Fixed Base Operations (FBO) and Maintenance Repair & Overhaul (MRO) centre of operations at London Biggin Hill Airport.

In Dec 2021, Avia Solutions Group announced the launch of 'Digital Aero Technologies', a new business unit uniting digital and technology-focused companies working in aviation.

In April 2022, Avia Solutions Group subsidiary FL Technics acquired a Hanover-Based facility for aircraft wheels and brakes services.

In May 2022, Avia Solutions Group subsidiary Chapman Freeborn OBC opened a new office in Dubai.

In May 2022, Avia Solutions Group entered an agreement with JETEX to operate a FBO at Hangar 510 at Biggin Hill Airport (EGKB/BQH).

In June 2022, Avia Solutions Group opened the aviation innovation valley 'AeroCity Tech Valley' in Vilnius, Lithuania.

In August 2022, The Group's subsidiary Chapman Freeborn opened a new office in New York.

In August 2022, through its subsidiary BBN Cargo Airlines, Avia Solutions Group established a new cargo airlines BBN Airlines Indonesia based in Jakarta.

In Dec 2022, Avia Solutions Group adds new aircraft type Boeing 737 BBJ2 to its fleet via KlasJet, the subsidiary providing business aviation and ACMI services. 

In Feb 2023, the Group's subsidiary KlasJet, begins ACMI operations and adds 8 Boeing 737-800 aircraft to its fleet. It is the 3rd brand in the Group offering ACMI service, in addition to SmartLynx Airlines and Avion Express.

Awards

In 2011, Avia Solutions Group was recognized as one of the best debutants on WSE.

In 2012, Linas Dovydenas, CEO at Avia Solutions Group was awarded as the CEO of the year by the readers of business news website and newspaper “Verslo Zinios”.

In 2012, Gediminas Ziemelis, Chairman of Avia Solutions Group, was selected amongst the top 40 most talented young leaders in the aviation industry by Aviation Week & Space Technology.

In 2014, Gediminas Ziemelis, the chairman of the board of Avia Solutions Group, Anatolij Legenzov, CEO of Helisota have been included in the Aviation Weeks' Top 40 young leaders under 40 list. Gediminas Ziemelis became only person to be included two times in a row with his first repeat appearance in 2012.

In June 2016, Avia Solutions Group received a National Public Champion award and was named amongst 10 best European businesses in the RSM Entrepreneur of the Year category at the European Business Awards.

Avia Solutions Group was named Exporter of the year for 2018 by the Lithuanian Industrialist Confederation.

Corporate governance

Board
The management board currently has 6 members. Gediminas Ziemelis, chairman of the board, and 5 members – Jonas Janukenas, chief executive officer at Avia Solutions Group, Zilvinas Lapinskas, CEO of FL Technics, Linas Dovydenas, Chief Commercial Officer of Avia Solutions Group, Pascal Picano and Tom Klein, Member of the Board at Avia Solutions Group.

Shareholders 
As of Dec 2022, the Group's ordinary shares are distributed in the following proportions.

Convertible preferred Shares:

Structure

Current companies

Avia Solutions Group has offices in Lithuania, Cyprus, Ireland, UAE, the US, the UK, Serbia, Estonia, Thailand and Indonesia, China. As of 2022, Avia Solutions Group controls the following companies:

 FL Technics, FL Technics Indonesia, FL ARI, Flash Line Maintenance, Storm Aviation Ltd, Enginestands.com, JetMS, Helisota, FL Technics Engine Services, Wright International, JETMS Holdings, Chevron Technical Services  – providers of maintenance and repair of commercial and business aviation airplanes, as well as helicopters;
 BAA Training, BAA Training Spain, BAA Training Vietnam, BAA Training China, BGS Training, FL Technics Online Training, AviationCV – aviation training and recruitment providers;
Avia Solutions Group Consulting – aviation consulting services;
AviaAM Leasing, AviaAM Leasing China – aircraft leasing and trading service providers;
Chapman Freeborn, Intradco Global, Arcus Air Logistic, Arcus OBC, Skyllence – charter broker services providers;
Chapman Freeborn OBC, Arcus Air Logistic, Arcus OBC – time critical logistics providers;
Avion Express, SmartLynx Airlines – ACMI lease service providers;
 BGS, Aviator – ground handling and fueling provider;
BGS Rail – railway freight transport;
Chapman Freeborn – flight ops and dispatcher services providers;
Busnex – public transportation solutions provider;
 Digital Aero Technologies, Aeroclass, Locatory.com, Sensus Aero, MOMook, Nordic Dino, FL Technics Online Training, AeroTime Hub, Air Convention Digital Week, Enginestands.com, EVMOTORS.EU - Online platforms, e-learning, marketplaces .
 KlasJet – business aviation charter air carrier and business jet manager;
 AeroTime Hub, AIR Convention, Seven Live – Aviation Media and Events;
Magma Aviation, BBN Cargo Airlines Holdings, BBN Airlines Nordic, BBN Airlines Indonesia, SmartLynx, Arcus Air Logistic, Arcus OBC – airfreight service providers;
 Loop Holding – hospitality holding company and hotel operator.

Previous companies
Companies that were part of Avia Solutions Group:
 FlyLaL – national airline of Lithuania (bankrupt)
 BPC Travel – travel agency (spun out)
 UAB Passenger Terminal – construction company to build a new passenger terminal at Vilnius Airport (abandoned)
  Small Planet Airlines – charter airline (sold)
 Laserpas – provider of aerial infrastructure inspections by UAVs (sold)
BGS Poland - ground handling services provider (sold)

References 

Transport companies of Lithuania
Airline holding companies
Companies based in Vilnius
Transport companies established in 2005
Companies listed on the Warsaw Stock Exchange
Lithuanian companies established in 2005